Resin wicker, also known as all-weather wicker, is manufactured predominantly for use in outdoor patio furniture. It is meant to look like natural wicker, but is made of a synthetic material, generally polyethylene. In the UK, it is known as rattan garden furniture, as the more traditional natural rattan has fallen out of fashion.

Wicker is not actually a material, but a method of weaving. The word is said to be derived from the Scandinavian word "vika" which means "to bend."  Traditionally, natural plant materials were used to manufacture a variety of different products including baskets, trays, indoor and outdoor furniture. Wicker was originally made from natural fibers, such as rattan, a material derived from the so-called rotan tree, a vine like plant. The term rattan is sometimes used interchangeably with wicker, but in fact denotes the fiber used to create the wicker work. Rattan is somewhat elastic and often used to produce baskets, hampers and chairs. The branch-like material is woven together for the purpose of constructing various wicker items. Resin wicker is a similar looking material. Synthetic polyethylene fiber resin wicker is generally durable, resistant to the sun's ultraviolet radiation and water. Resin wicker is often used over an aluminum frame to create lightweight outdoor furniture.

References

Plastics applications